Camping is a 2006 French comedy film directed by Fabien Onteniente. Two sequels have been made, Camping 2 in 2010 and Camping 3 in 2016.

Plot 
In August each year, many families go camping at Blue Waves, in Arcachon, on the Atlantic coast. Barbecues, thongs, pastis, and volleyball encounters with naturists are of course all part of the campers' baggage. Escapist desires to Shogun (the local nightclub) are pressing. This year, the reunion could have been nice if not for this year's accumulation of unforeseen events.

Cast 

 Franck Dubosc as Patrick Chirac
 Gérard Lanvin as Michel Saint-Josse
 Mathilde Seigner as Sophie Gatineau
 Antoine Duléry as Paul Gatineau
 Claude Brasseur as Jacky Pic
 Mylène Demongeot as Laurette Pic
 Christine Citti as Madame Chatel
 Frédérique Bel as Christy Bergougnoux
 François Levantal as Boyer
 Armonie Sanders as Vanessa Saint-Josse
 Laurent Olmedo as The 37
 Abbes Zahmani as Mendez
 Edéa Darcque as Sidy Mendez
 Chaka Ressiga as Ari Mendez
 Noémie Elbaz as Jessica
 Michael Hofland as Cornelius
 Ida Techer as Cornelia
 Charlie Barde as Aurélie Gatineau
 Eliott Parillaud as Sébastien Gatineau
 Béatrice Costantini as Madame de Brantes
 Dominique Orsolle as Madame Ballot
 Geneviève Geulin as Madame Bigoudis
 Emmanuelle Galabru as Séverine
 Maxime Labet as Manu
 Ari Vatanen as himself

Accolades

References

External links
 

2006 films
2006 comedy films
French comedy films
Films about families
Films directed by Fabien Onteniente
2000s French films
2000s French-language films